Albert Pierre de Courville (26 March 1887 – 15 March 1960) (born in Croydon, England) was a writer and  director of theatrical revues, many of which featured the actress and singer Shirley Kellogg, whom he married in June 1913.

Career

In about 1907 he began work in London as a journalist with the Evening News. A good reporter, he was soon earning as much as £20 a week, but thought there were more possibilities, and money, in the theatre. He joined forces with London impresario Sir Edward Moss and staged revues at the London Hippodrome.

In the 1930s he turned to making films. His two most famous films, both featuring Jessie Matthews were There Goes the Bride (1932) and The Midshipmaid (1932). He also directed The Wrecker, an adaptation of Arnold Ridley’s play of the same name, and Seven Sinners (1936).

Personal life

In June 1913, he married actress and singer Shirley Kellogg. 

He and the actress Edith Kelly married in 1927. There were fears that this marriage would not happen as de Courville was in hospital before the marriage. De Courville recovered sufficiently to allow the marriage to happen on 26 May at a registry office.

Selected filmography

References

External links
 
 Albert de Courville at BFI
 Albert de Courville at AllMovie
 Albert de Courville at Rotten Tomatoes
 Revues by Albert de Courville on Great War Theatre

1887 births
1960 deaths
English film directors